Rogač  is a port village in Croatia on the northern coast of Šolta island in the Split-Dalmatia County. It is connected by the D112 highway and by ferry. In the small port with the Port Authority of the island, there is a filling station for cars and boats. Also land in Rogač car ferries. The place belongs to Grohote and has 110 inhabitants.

Populated places in Split-Dalmatia County
Šolta